The Chicago White Sox are a Major League Baseball franchise based in Chicago. They play in the American League Central division. Pitchers for the White Sox have thrown twenty no-hitters in franchise history. A no-hitter is officially recognized by Major League Baseball only "when a pitcher (or pitchers) allows no hits during the entire course of a game, which consists of at least nine innings. In a no-hit game, a batter may reach base via a walk, an error, a hit by pitch, a passed ball or wild pitch on strike three, or catcher’s interference." No-hitters of less than nine complete innings were previously recognized by the league as official; however, several rule alterations in 1991 changed the rule to its current form. Three perfect games, a special subcategory of no-hitter, have been pitched in White Sox history, which equals the New York Yankees for the most perfect games pitched by any MLB franchise. As defined by Major League Baseball, "in a perfect game, no batter reaches any base during the course of the game." These feats were achieved by Charlie Robertson in 1922, which was the first perfect game on the road in MLB history, Mark Buehrle in 2009, and Philip Humber in 2012.

Nixey Callahan threw the first no-hitter in White Sox history on September 20, 1902; the most recent no-hitter was thrown by Carlos Rodón on April 14, 2021. Only three left-handed pitchers have thrown no-hitters in franchise history and four of the six most recent no-hitters: Wilson Álvarez (in 1991), Buehrle (in 2007 and 2009), Rodón (in 2021). The other 17 pitchers were right-handed. Two pitchers have thrown more than one no-hitter in a White Sox uniform, including a hall of famer Ed Walsh and Buehrle. Twelve no-hitters were thrown at home and eight on the road. They threw five in April, one in May, one in June, two in July, six in August, and five in September. The longest interval between no-hitters was between the games pitched by Bill Dietrich and Bob Keegan, encompassing twenty years, two months, and nineteen days from June 1, 1937 till August 20, 1957. Conversely, the shortest interval between no-hitters was between the games pitched by Lucas Giolito and Rodón, encompassing seven months and twenty days from August 25, 2020 until April 14th, 2021. They no-hit the Detroit Tigers the most, which occurred four times, which were defeated by Callahan in 1902, Smith in 1905, Robertson in 1920, and Joel Horlen in 1967. There have been three no-hitters which the team allowed at least a run, one by Joe Benz, a combined no-hitter by Blue Moon Odom and Francisco Barrios, and most recently by Joe Cowley in 1986. The most baserunners allowed in a White Sox no-hitter was a combined no-hitter by Odom and Barrios (in 1976), who allowed 12. Of the twenty no-hitters, four have been won by a score of 6–0, more common than any other results. The largest margin of victory in a White Sox no-hitter was a 15–0 win by Frank Smith in 1905. The smallest margin of victory was a 1–0 win by Smith in 1908 and by Odom and Barrios who combined to throw a no-hitter in a 2–1 victory in 1976.

The umpire is also an integral part of any no-hitter. The task of the umpire in a baseball game is to make any decision "which involves judgment, such as, but not limited to, whether a batted ball is fair or foul, whether a pitch is a strike or a ball, or whether a runner is safe or out… [the umpire’s judgment on such matters] is final." Part of the duties of the umpire making calls at home plate includes defining the strike zone, which "is defined as that area over homeplate (sic) the upper limit of which is a horizontal line at the midpoint between the top of the shoulders and the top of the uniform pants, and the lower level is a line at the hollow beneath the kneecap." These calls define every baseball game and are therefore integral to the completion of any no-hitter. Sixteen different umpires presided over the White Sox’ twenty no-hitters. Notably Eric Cooper umpired both Buehrle’s no-hitters, and Doug Eddings, who umpired Carlos Rodón's no-hitter, was also the umpire of the White Sox' 2005 American League Championship Series game 2 win over Los Angeles involving the infamous dropped third strike call.

The manager is another integral part of any no-hitter. The tasks of the manager include determining the starting rotation as well as the batting order and defensive lineup every game. Seventeen different managers have led the team during the White Sox’ twenty no-hitters.

No-hitters

See also
List of Major League Baseball no-hitters

References
General reference

Inline citations

No-hitters
Chicago White Sox